Freedom Mobile Inc. is a Canadian wireless telecommunications provider owned by Shaw Communications. It has 6% market share of Canada, mostly in urban areas of Ontario, British Columbia and Alberta. Freedom Mobile is the fourth-largest wireless carrier in Canada, with 2,290,497 subscribers as of November 30, 2022.

Founded in 2008 as Wind Mobile by the telecommunications company Globalive, Freedom was one of several new mobile carriers launched in Canada in 2008 after a government initiative to encourage competition in the wireless sector alongside Mobilicity (later acquired by Rogers Communications) and Public Mobile (later acquired by Telus). It initially launched mobile data and voice services in the Greater Toronto and Hamilton Area, Ontario, on December 16, 2009, and two days later in Calgary, Alberta. Since then, Southern Ontario has been the main target of network expansion: first with Ottawa in Q1 2011, and then with about half a dozen additional regions, the most recently being Cornwall, Cobourg, Belleville, Trenton, Brockville, and Pembroke on March 8, 2019.

On June 17, 2022, Shaw Communications, Rogers Communications and Québecor jointly announced an agreement for the sale of Freedom Mobile to Québecor, parent of Vidéotron, pending approval of Competition Bureau and Minister of Innovation, Science and Economic Development.

History

2008: Wind Mobile founded
Globalive, a Canadian company was primarily financed by an Egyptian corporation, Orascom Telecom Holding, and managed by Wind Telecom S.p.A., which owns a number of other "Wind" brand telecommunications companies. Globalive bid $442 million (CAD) in 2008 to secure the Advanced Wireless Services (AWS) wireless spectrum (3G at 1,700mhz) required for the launch of the network. Ken Campbell, a former Vodafone and Orascom executive, was named as the first chief executive officer of Globalive Wireless in 2008. The launch of the company was delayed due to a public ownership review by the Canadian Radio-television and Telecommunications Commission (CRTC). The regulatory body stated that Globalive did not meet Canadian ownership requirements. The most prominent issue was Globalive's reliance on Orascom for its debt, which stood at $508 million (CAD).

2009: Network tests, government approval, retail partnership and launch 
Globalive completed its first test call on the network in June 2009.

On December 11 of that year, the Governor-in-Council (acting on the advice of Tony Clement, then Minister of Industry) issued a final decision deeming that Globalive does meet ownership requirements, allowing Globalive to enter the Canadian market immediately.

On December 14, shortly before the peak of the Christmas and holiday season, Wind announced an alliance with Blockbuster LLC in Canada to offer Wind kiosks and prepaid products within Blockbuster stores at 16 locations, 13 in Ontario and 3 in Calgary. On December 16, Wind Mobile launched its service in Toronto. A launch event was hosted at its Queens Quay location in downtown Toronto.

Wind gained "close to 5,000 subscribers" during the 16 days it offered service in 2009.

2010: Robbins resigns, creation of urban networks, 100K subscribers and Windtab 

Chris Robbins, Chief Customer Officer, resigned from Wind Mobile on March 4, 2010. Both Robbins and Wind Mobile said that the departure was due to strategic changes and the former wanting to pursue other business opportunities. Analysts assessed the change negatively speculating that an executive departure so early reflected disappointing market penetration.

On March 27, 2010, Wind Mobile launched its service in Ottawa. A launch event was hosted at the Rideau Street location. Service was also launched in most of Greater Vancouver area and Edmonton, Alberta throughout the year.

Wind Mobile announced on August 13 that in early July, they had reached "the 100,000 mark in terms of new wireless subscribers". Orascom's third-quarter financial report, released in November 2010, listed Wind's subscriber base as 139,681.

2011: Orascom sells to Vimpelcom, First CEO Campbell resigns, Court proceedings, VimpelCom, Ontario expansion and Windtab+ 
 On February 4, 2011, the Federal Court ruled in a suit brought by competitors Public Mobile and Telus that the Governor in Council's decision regarding Wind's Canadian ownership requirements was improper. Wind was granted a 45-day stay of the decision to file arguments.  On May 18, the Federal Court of Appeal heard arguments from Wind and the federal government as to why the Federal Court decision should be quashed.  The Federal Court of Appeal's decision allowed Globalive's appeal and restored the Governor in Council's order that Wind met Canadian ownership requirements.  On September 19, Public Mobile entered an application for leave to appeal to the Supreme Court of Canada.

On March 17, the shareholders of Russian mobile telephone operator VimpelCom voted in support of a $6 billion deal to acquire Wind Telecom, whose assets include Orascom Telecom, a significant shareholder in Wind Mobile. The transaction would create the world's fifth largest mobile operator by subscribers – more than 173 million subscribers.

In June 2011, Ken Campbell, the founding CEO, departed the company.  Campbell had led the management team since start up, leading the build out of the company in its five major markets. He went on to be CEO at a former Orascom property, Tunisiana, the leading operator in Tunisia, and co-found the Canadian cellphone repair chain Mobile Klinik. Wind's network in the region of Kitchener and Waterloo (K-W) was launched on August 16, during the back to school season of 2011. In conjunction with this launch, the company introduced a Windtab+ option for Pay After customers, and a promotional Super Smart plan for all customers.  Both services were available to all Wind subscribers in any Wind zones. Guelph coverage was announced on September 9 and two stores opened in Guelph by the end of the month.  The St. Catharines and Welland zones were launched on October 15, and one store was opened in each city.  The provider added more stores in October for all these regions, along with new handsets and special promotions.

The carrier launched a new advertising campaign on November 7, adopting the slogan "That's the power of Wind" and reinforcing orange as its official colour.  A promotional "Oh Canada" plan was also offered in conjunction with the new campaign.  Service in Niagara Falls was launched on November 23.  To celebrate, the company offered 30 Nokia C7 smartphones at its store in The Pen Centre shopping mall.  Wind plans to connect the Niagara region coverage with that of the Greater Toronto Area.  The Abbotsford and Cambridge cities were added to Wind's network between December 4 and 6. London was added the following week, on December 13.

2012: Further Ontario expansion 

Wind Mobile refreshed its plan lineup on March 1, 2012; the Clever and Brilliant plans were eliminated, Pay Your Way permanently included unlimited incoming calls answered when using Wind's network, while the mid-range Smart and high-end Genius plans lost their monikers and had some features changed. Only SMS messages sent to Canadian numbers were included, and all MMS or non-Canadian SMS became pay-per-use.  The Wind 25 plan included 100 MB of mobile Internet access, while the Wind 40 plan feature 5 GB of full-speed mobile Internet instead of voice-mail.

Wind's network in Southern Ontario expanded throughout 2012.  Kingston, Peterborough and Woodstock were added throughout Q3 2012.  Although the carrier initially planned to add Windsor during that same fiscal quarter, the plans were delayed

Small business pricing was launched in October 2012 to coincide with Small Business Week. This includes a premium monthly plan and lower Windtab pricing on several high-end phones purchased with that plan. Windsor and Peterborough coverage and retail presence went live in November 2012 along with two new "Wish" customer monthly plans.  Both include global SMS and reduced international long-distance rates. TDD and IP relay operator services were launched by Wind in December 2012.  Throughout the year, 122 additional retail locations were added, and 231 network sites.  The operator finished 2012 with 200,000 Facebook fans and 35,000 Twitter followers.

2013: Lacavera steps down 

The promotional Wish plans were extended for the month of January and the first three days in February 2013. On January 18, 2013, Anthony Lacavera announced that he would no longer assume the role of CEO and instead become a chairman for the company. At the same time, the company announced that it had reached around 600,000 subscribers. VimpelCom Ltd. began seeking potential buyers for Wind in March 2013.

On April 10, 2013, Wind Mobile announced that it would withdraw from the Canadian Wireless Telecommunications Association. Competitors Mobilicity and Public Mobile also withdrew from the CWTA, citing bias to its competitors Bell, Rogers, and Telus as justification.

On June 19, 2013, Orascom Telecom, a subsidiary of Vimpelcom, withdrew its application to take full control of Wind Mobile – which reversed an earlier decision.

On June 26, 2013, The Globe and Mail reported that American provider Verizon Wireless made a $700 million offer to acquire Wind Mobile, though the company later announced it had no interest in entering the Canadian wireless market.

It was reported on September 4, 2013, that Wind Mobile was in negotiations to assume struggling competitor Mobilicity's customers as it shut down its consumer operations, though this report was later denied by Mobilicity.

2014: Recapitalization, investors buy out Vimpelcom/Wind Telecom stake 

On January 13, 2014, majority shareholder VimpelCom (which owned indirect equity in Wind Mobile through its subsidiaries Wind Telecom and Global Telecom Holding) pulled out its financial backing for Wind Mobile's bid in the Industry Canada 700 MHz spectrum auction following a dispute with the Canadian federal government. The resulting fallout led some observers to cast doubt on Wind's ability in deploying LTE services on its network due to shortfalls in its spectrum holdings.

In September 2014, VimpelCom's majority stake in Wind Mobile was sold to AAL Acquisitions Corporation (a holding company controlled by Wind Mobile founder Anthony Lacavera) for a fee of $135 million, with the consortium also assuming $150 million of Wind's debt.  The deal received regulatory approval from Industry Canada in November 2014 and Wind's spectrum licences were transferred to AAL Acquisitions Corp. The stake and spectrum licences were then transferred to Mid-Bowline Holdings Corporation, a company controlled by a consortium of investors consisting of Globalive and several private equity firms based in Canada and the United States. Wind Mobile continued to license the Wind name and logo, which remained trademarks of Wind Telecom, until 2016.

New CEO Pietro Cordova announced in December 2014 that Wind was engaging in planning for further expansion and development of LTE services, including bidding in the Canadian government's 2015 spectrum auctions, which was not possible when the company was controlled by VimpelCom. Cordova stated that such a plan may also include purchasing spectrum from companies that are under-utilizing it (such as Vidéotron Mobile's spectrum licences outside Quebec and the unused AWS spectrum purchased by Shaw Communications in the previous auction) as well as developing agreements with other providers such as Mobilicity and Vidéotron to expand Wind's footprint. The company's new priorities also included improving the network quality in their existing coverage areas.

Cordova also stated in an interview that Wind might be ready for an initial public offering in 2016 or 2017, if the Mid-Bowline Holdings investors agree.

2015: Attempted merger with Mobilicity, spectrum acquisitions and transfers
In February 2015, the Financial Post had reported that Wind Mobile was in negotiations to take over Mobilicity in the weeks leading up to the AWS-3 spectrum auction registration deadline. The negotiations had been reportedly stalled due to the high price that Mobilicity's creditors were requesting from Wind to purchase the smaller carrier's assets. Discussions halted on January 30, 2015 (the application deadline for the spectrum auction), since both carriers had registered for the auction and anti-collusion regulations prohibited any discussion or negotiation of deals between competitors during the auction.

Industry Canada announced the results of the AWS-3 auction on 6 March 2015. Mobilicity ultimately withdrew from the auction due to lack of funding, which allowed Wind to acquire the entire spectrum block set aside for new entrants in Alberta, British Columbia, and southern Ontario uncontested. The $56.4 million bid allowed Wind to increase its spectrum holdings in areas where it offers service by 180 percent.

On March 23, 2015, Alek Krstajic, former CEO of rival start-up Public Mobile, was named CEO of Wind Mobile Corporation, and Robert MacLellan, a former executive of Toronto-Dominion Bank, was made chairman of the board. At the time, Wind's shareholders included the Toronto hedge fund West Face Capital (35%), the California-based fund Tennenbaum Capital Partners (31%), and Globalive Capital Voting Group (25%), which included Tony Lacavera's investment fund together with investment vehicles owned by Alex Shnaider, Terrence Hui, and Michael Serruya, and an investment firm controlled by Lawrence Guffey (8%).

On June 17, 2015, Wind Mobile became the first cellular provider to offer service in TTC subway stations through an agreement with BAI Canada, the company which owns the infrastructure that provides mobile and Wi-Fi service for the TTC subway network. The deal included Wind having exclusive rights to the underground mobile system for one year before BAI Canada would allow other providers to join the system.

Under the terms of Rogers Communications' acquisition of Mobilicity in June 2015, Wind purchased certain AWS spectrum licences formerly held by Shaw Communications (purchased by Rogers in a separate deal) and Mobilicity for the provinces of British Columbia, Alberta, Saskatchewan, Manitoba, and northern and eastern regions of Ontario for a "peppercorn" payment of $1 per licence. Wind negotiated an option to pay Rogers $25 million for half of Mobilicity's cell sites and other infrastructure at a later date. Additionally, Wind agreed to swap spectrum licences with Rogers in southern Ontario so that both companies' AWS spectrum blocks were contiguous.

These new licences allowed Wind to increase its network capacity and the potential to develop a network across all of western Canada. However, on July 31, 2015, Wind sold several of the newly acquired AWS-1 spectrum licences to regional telecom companies in Manitoba and Saskatchewan, with Wind stating its desire to focus on providing better regional competition in the provinces where it already offered service (British Columbia, Alberta, and Ontario) and upgrade its network to LTE, both of which would be funded using proceeds from the sales. All of Wind's five spectrum licences in Manitoba were sold to MTS for $45 million, and all of Wind's six spectrum licences in Saskatchewan were sold to SaskTel for an undisclosed amount.

Wind announced on December 15, 2015, that it was beginning a "planned cross-Canada network upgrade" starting with the Greater Vancouver coverage area. This upgrade included adding new antennas, replacing existing infrastructure with new equipment from Nokia Networks, and the deployment of new AWS-1 spectrum to improve network performance.

2016–17: Purchase by Shaw, Freedom Mobile name change 
Shaw Communications announced on December 16, 2015, that it planned to acquire Wind Mobile's parent company Mid-Bowline Group in a deal worth approximately $1.6 billion. The acquisition required approval by Innovation, Science and Economic Development Canada (formerly Industry Canada) and the Competition Bureau. As part of the announcement of the transaction Shaw Communications outlined some terms of the acquisition: then-CEO Alek Krstajic would remain to lead Wind as a division within Shaw and it would remain headquartered in Toronto as a "distinct unit", Wind would remain a budget-priced mobile carrier at least for the short term, and the network upgrade from HSPA 3G to a faster LTE network would continue as planned. Brad Shaw, CEO of Shaw Communications, stated in an interview that the acquisition of Wind would allow Shaw to compete "at the same level" as an integrated telecommunications provider with rival Telus in western Canada and gain a foothold in the Ontario telecom market.

Wind completed the planned upgrades to its HSPA network in Vancouver in February 2016, announcing that the next coverage area to be upgraded would be Calgary.

The purchase was approved by the Competition Bureau on February 4, 2016 and the purchase of Wind Mobile by Shaw was completed on March 1, 2016. Shaw sold Shaw Media to Corus Entertainment, a company also controlled by the Shaw family, as part of the funding for the deal. Krstajic was given the new title within Shaw of "Executive Vice President & President, Wind" and continued to lead the new subsidiary.

LTE launch, re-branding 

On November 21, 2016, Shaw announced that Wind Mobile had been renamed to Freedom Mobile. The company stated that it no longer wanted to license the Wind brand from VimpelCom due to increasing royalty fees, while CEO Alek Krstajic justified the move by stating that the company wanted to shed the "baggage" of the Wind name, and use the new ownership and developments as a means of re-launching the carrier.

The same day, Freedom announced that it would be launching LTE service on the AWS-3 band in Toronto and Vancouver, with a nationwide rollout to be completed by the end of fiscal year 2017. LTE access would require purchase of a compatible device and service plan; the company justified this requirement by noting that the service utilizes bands that are currently underutilized and not widely supported by existing LTE devices, and thus promoted that its network was a "superhighway" in comparison to other providers. Freedom will implement LTE service in Ottawa, Kingston and Peterborough on the AWS-1 band, providing LTE access to customers with existing AWS-1-compatible devices.

CEO Alek Krstajic, who had headed Freedom Mobile throughout the acquisition by Shaw, stepped down in April 2017 and was replaced by Paul McAleese. McAleese's title was changed to chief operating officer.

Freedom Mobile announced on November 7, 2017, that LTE access was enabled on all grandfathered 3G plans at no additional cost. This coincided with a planned national upgrade of Freedom cell sites to utilize newly acquired 2,500 MHz (Band 7) spectrum and the re-allocation of some AWS-1 (Band 4) spectrum for LTE, both of which are compatible with a greater number of devices than Freedom's initial AWS-3 (Band 66) LTE network.

On August 13, 2018, Freedom Mobile launched VoLTE, letting calls go over Freedom's LTE network instead of the 3G network.  At launch, only the LG G6 and G7 were supported. As of November 1, 2018, the list of VoLTE supported devices has grown to support the iPhone, Galaxy S9/S9+, Galaxy S8/S8+, Galaxy Note8/9, Galaxy A8, LG V30, LG X Power 2 and 3, LG Q Stylo+, Moto E5 Play, Moto G6 Play, Sony Xperia XA2/XA2 Ultra, Xperia XZ2, Google Pixel 3/3 XL, and the Alcatel GoFlip.

Freedom's Extended Range LTE service was unveiled and launched in parts of Calgary on October 9, 2018, providing Freedom Mobile users with better LTE coverage inside buildings, basements and elevators. A week later on October 16, 2018, the service had expanded to Edmonton, Hamilton, and parts of BC. Starting from October 23, 2018, parts of the Greater Toronto Area, Milton and Pickering had Extended Range LTE. Phones with Band 13 compatibility and VoLTE support can access Extended Range LTE.

2022: On sale by Rogers 
As part of Rogers' proposal to address competition concerns in its $26-billion takeover of Shaw, Rogers agreed to sell Freedom to telecommunications company  Vidéotron's owner Quebecor for $2.85 billion. The deal includes Freedom Mobile's wireless and internet customers, infrastructure, spectrum and retail sites. Globalive Capital the founder of Freedom Mobile's precursor also made a bid by striking a network and spectrum sharing deal with telecom giant Telus.

Network
Freedom Mobile provides UMTS wireless services with High Speed Packet Access (HSPA) for data using its license for UMTS Band IV, also known as the Advanced Wireless Services (AWS) band.  Using this band user equipment transmits at 1710–1755 MHz and receives at 2110–2155 MHz. HSPA+ was activated on Freedom's network starting in mid-2011.

Freedom Mobile was the first Canadian wireless service provider to make use of Advanced Wireless Services bands for its primary network. In North America, T-Mobile US is the largest provider to use this spectrum.  Freedom's use of AWS requires that customers use an AWS-capable handset which, at launch, were somewhat less common than Band 2 (PCS) and Band 5 (Cellular) handsets, which predate Band 4 (AWS) by more than 10 years.

Since Freedom's launch in Canada, other service providers have begun operations using AWS. Those that primarily use this spectrum for their network include Eastlink Wireless and Vidéotron Mobile. Canada's three largest mobile companies (Rogers Wireless, Bell Mobility and Telus Mobility) and their subsidiary brands, as well as independent regional provider SaskTel, only use AWS for their LTE networks.  Bell and Rogers deployed LTE in late 2011, while Telus deployed it in early 2012 while maintaining a mutual roaming agreement with Bell.  Devices that support AWS LTE but not AWS HSPA+ are incompatible with Freedom's network. In late 2015, Freedom announced it secured $425 million in funding to build its own LTE network, meaning it would be able to offer 4G speeds up to 5x faster than those offered through the current HSPA+ network.

Freedom's LTE network uses AWS-3 spectrum it obtained in a 2015 spectrum auction. The rollout is expected to be completed by August 2017. In June 2017, Freedom's parent company Shaw announced that it had made a $430 million deal to acquire 700 MHz and 2500 MHz spectrum licences covering Alberta, British Columbia, and southern Ontario from Quebecor (the parent company of Vidéotron Mobile). The acquisition received regulatory approval from Innovation, Science and Economic Development Canada on July 10, 2017 and closed on July 24, 2017.

Coverage
The current network in Ontario includes the Greater Toronto and Hamilton Area, Ottawa, Kitchener, Waterloo, Cambridge, Guelph, part of the Niagara Region, London, Brantford, Barrie, Kingston, Windsor, Amherstburg, Woodstock, Lindsay, Pembroke, Brockville, Belleville and Peterborough. Outside of Ontario, Freedom has coverage in Gatineau, Quebec, across from Ottawa, ON; Calgary, Edmonton, Sherwood Park, Fort Saskatchewan, St. Albert, Beaumont, Leduc, Nisku, Lethbridge, Medicine Hat, Red Deer and Edmonton International Airport in Alberta; plus the Greater Vancouver area, Victoria, Nanaimo, Courtenay, Comox, Campbell River, Cranbrook, Kelowna, Penticton, Prince George, Prince Rupert, Whistler, and Abbotsford in British Columbia.

Maximum theoretical speeds for mobile broadband are of 21.1 Mbit/s in most regions and 14.4 Mbit/s in other regions. In 2015, Freedom Mobile upgraded its existing HSPA+ network to DC-HSPA+, which has a theoretical maximum speed of 42 Mbit/s. Independent speed tests as of April 2018 confirm download speeds up to 62.8 Mbit/s and upload speeds up to 14.8 Mbit/s on the LTE band in the city of Toronto. When using CA (Carrier Aggregation, also displayed as "LTE+") in certain supported areas on supported devices, speed tests of 180 Mbit/s download and higher have been achieved.

Throughout 2012, Freedom planned to launch service in several new cities while continuing to expand the edges and increase the density of its network in existing cities. Customers travelling outside of Freedom's "Home" network areas now known as "Freedom" while roaming is known as "Nationwide" and subscribers can roam on Rogers Wireless, Telus Mobility and Bell Mobility where coverage exists (the "Away" network).  Pay-per-use charges apply for such roaming, or have set amounts of data, minutes and texting on higher rate plans.

In late 2018, Freedom announced that it had plans to expand its coverage to cities, such as Victoria and Nanaimo in British Columbia; Red Deer, Medicine Hat and Lethbridge in Alberta; and Pembroke, Cornwall, Brockville, Belleville and Cobourg in Ontario. And, on February 8, 2019, Freedom launched their network in Victoria, British Columbia and Red Deer in Alberta.

iPhone support
Because of Freedom's reliance on the AWS HSPA+ network, there are limitations on which phones the carrier has been able to offer its subscribers. The iPhone was absent from Freedom's device lineup until late 2017. Apple only began manufacturing AWS-compatible iPhones in early 2013 when AWS carrier T-Mobile US began selling the iPhone 5.

Though newer iPhone models are compatible with Freedom's network, the carrier was not able to strike an agreement with Apple to sell the iPhone directly to its subscribers until 2017. Carrying the iPhone is considered to be one of the most potent single sales drivers for any mobile network operator, a fact cited after the launch of the iPhone 5 when Rogers signed up more new customers in a week than Wind Mobile had typically attracted over a three-month period.

With the introduction of AWS-compatible iPhones to the market in 2013, subscribers turned to other sources to buy unlocked iPhones that were AWS-compatible. Around 2,500 iPhones were activated on the network by September 2013. At the time, some suggested that Apple, known to be controlling about its products, would require Freedom to provide LTE coverage before the carrier would be granted the ability to sell the iPhone. In order to remain competitive, Wind began working on alternative sources for the phone.

Freedom began offering refurbished iPhone 5C and iPhone 5S devices to its customers starting in 2015. Freedom's supply of the iPhone came through a deal with Ingram Micro, the company which distributes iPhones and iPads in Canada on behalf of Apple. Shortly after learning of the deal, Apple's Canadian division ordered Ingram Micro to stop supplying Freedom with the refurbished devices. According to Apple, Ingram's actions were prohibited in their contract. Sources interviewed by The Globe and Mail stated that the response by Apple may have been prompted by Bell Canada. In December 2015, new CEO Alek Krstajic stated that the company had "started some conversations with Apple" about selling the iPhone.

Alongside the impending launch of its LTE network, Freedom released the LG V20 and ZTE Grand X4 as its first LTE-compatible devices.

In November 2017, Freedom gained the ability to sell the iPhone to its customers on its LTE Network.

Radio frequency summary

Services

Voice

At launch, three personal monthly voice plans were available from Freedom Mobile.  The lowest priced plan had limited minutes, with rollover minutes in later revisions, but was since discontinued. In 2017, it was superseded by a Home 25 plan with unlimited incoming calls and a bucket of outgoing minutes. The latter two launch plans were revised over the years, and are now replaced with Home 30 and Home 40 plans, also featuring a small amount of mobile Internet access.

Occasionally, Freedom offers promotional plans with some or many bonus features to new and existing subscribers, notably the "Holiday Miracle" and the "Unlimited USA" plans. Small business customers received an exclusive plan in October 2012. This was later replaced to allow small businesses to choose the same rate plans as customers.

Big Gig base plans include unlimited in-zone incoming calls and pay-per-use outgoing calls. For an additional charge, Freedom offers unlimited in-zone outgoing calls to Canada and the United States, plus a bucket of 2,400 minutes for out-of-zone calls from Canada.

A variety of add-ons exist to add extra features to these plans such as voicemail and reduced rates for long-distance calling or roaming.  Pay Your Way offered a broader selection of add-ons for talk time and messaging.

Freedom introduced HD Voice across its entire network on compatible handsets in September 2012. Freedom began enabling Wi-Fi calling for compatible handsets, at time of launch only the LG V20 but has since expanded, in April 2017.  On August 13, 2018, Freedom Mobile launched VoLTE with support for two phone models.

Mobile Internet
Freedom offers various data services for its subscribers:
 Big Gig: includes a 10 to 20 GB in-zone Internet allowance, 250 MB to 2 GB out-of-zone Internet allowance and several calling features. Outgoing phone calls are pay-per-use.
 Everywhere Canada: a premium Big Gig plan, it adds unlimited in-zone outgoing calls and a bucket of out-of-zone calling minutes. The out-of-zone Internet allowance is either 500 MB or 1 GB.
 Tablet: includes a 2 GB in-zone Internet allowance and no calling features. Promotions can increase this allowance.
 Mobile Internet: includes a 10 GB in-zone Internet allowance and no calling features.

A variety of monthly plans are offered for both phones and mobile broadband modems. A pay per use plan also exists that bills based on the amount of time data is used. Customers used a monthly average of 0.9 GB in Q2 2013 and 1.5 GB in Q2 2014.

All Freedom customers, including those without a mobile Internet plan or add-on, can access the WindWorld web portal and the Facebook Zero social networking service at no cost. WindWorld consists of CBC News headlines, The Weather Network summaries for cities served by Freedom, premium mobile downloads, and monthly bill payments for Freedom accounts.

Mobile Internet plans and add-ons contain limits on usage. Lower cost plans have a hard limit for data usage; customers will be billed for excess usage. Higher cost plans incorporate a soft limit; usage exceeding this limit may result in the customer's device being throttled to allow other customers fair access to the network. Throttling speeds are typically 256 kbit/s for downloads and 128 kbit/s for uploads.  In what Freedom defines as "extreme cases", speeds will be slower than dial-up Internet access at 32 kbit/s for downloads and 16 kbit/s for uploads.  When throttling does occur, Freedom will inform customers of the reduced speeds.

Subsidies
The Windtab is a billing method introduced on November 5, 2010, well before the Christmas and holiday season of that year.  It is very similar to Koodo Mobile's Tab payment system in that it subsidizes retail price of a device by placing the amount of the subsidy on a tab balance.  Like Koodo, it only works on postpaid activations, known as Pay After.

During the Kitchener-Waterloo launch day on August 16, 2011, Wind introduced another subsidy option called the Windtab+. This increased the subsidy provided on more costly devices when combined with certain plans. At the same time Wind introduced the "Pay-off Promise": accounts in good standing with devices purchased under the Windtab+ agreement would have any remaining balance on their tab cleared after two years of service (originally three years prior to aligning to the CRTC Wireless Code in 2013).

As part of Wind's plan simplification during the month of March in 2012, the Windtab+ was simply renamed to Windtab.  The amount of the subsidy depends on the device and plan chosen, though all plans continue to include the Pay-off Promise.

New monthly plans and lower Windtab amounts were introduced in February 2013. For all plans, the subsidy cannot exceed the outright price of the device.  Since that time, those without Windtab can receive service credits in lieu of a phone subsidy.

Following its acquisition by Shaw in 2016, Wind changed the Windtab system on March 22 of that year to decrease by a fixed amount per month rather than decreasing by 10 percent of the user's monthly plan costs for that month. The fixed amount is determined based on dividing the current tab balance by the number of months remaining until the Pay-off Promise, and customers now had the option to make additional payments into their tab balance directly. The changes to the Windtab applied to both new and existing accounts, with a one-time tab credit to bring existing customers to the tab value they would have if they started on the new system.

Following the rebranding to Freedom Mobile, the Windtab was renamed to MyTab.

Roaming
When a customer is outside of Freedom Mobile's coverage, services are provided by its roaming partners. Freedom roaming partners include Rogers Wireless, Bell Mobility and Telus Mobility within Canada; and AT&T Mobility for the United States. Talk and text services while connected to these carriers are charged at pay-per-use rates unless a customer has a plan which includes roaming or, in the case of US roaming, purchased a monthly add-on.

Regardless of plan, received text messages are free throughout the world.  As of 2017, the three incumbent wireless providers in Canada continue to charge much more than Freedom for roaming in the United States.

In conjunction with the 2012 Summer Olympics, Freedom launched a "World Traveller" add-on and made it available to monthly plan customers for free until September 30, 2012.

On February 3, 2014, Freedom launched an "Unlimited U.S. Roaming" add-on. This add-on was later bundled at no extra charge with a regular and promotional plan. Customers could initially use the same full speed Internet allowance that they subscribed to in Canada, based on their billing cycle, but the Fair Usage Policy was shortly thereafter modified to impose a separate 1 GB of full speed usage in the United States.

On April 13, 2016, Freedom introduced two "Everywhere" plans that included unlimited usage on its network and certain unlimited features on both its Canada and US roaming partners.

Effective 2017, Freedom dropped support for T-Mobile US roaming. The sole roaming provider for Freedom customers in the United States is now AT&T.

Foreign ownership controversy

In 2009, the Canadian Radio-television and Telecommunications Commission (CRTC) complained that Wind received the majority of its startup funding from the foreign company Orascom Telecom Holding.  The case was dismissed by Q4 of that year, allowing Wind to launch for the Christmas and holiday season.  Competitor Public Mobile quickly partnered with Telus Mobility for both roaming agreements and together sued Wind for its foreign ownership.  Telus later backed out, leaving Public alone to continue the lawsuit all the way to the Supreme Court of Canada.  On April 26, 2012, the Court announced that it would not hear the case about Wind Mobile's foreign ownership.  Public Mobile itself received foreign funding of at least $350 million from the Export-Import Bank of China in 2010.

Philanthropy
Wind's philanthropic arm is called "Windthanks".  This started during the back-to-school season of 2011 in conjunction with the Kitchener-Waterloo launch.  Those living in the region could nominate a charitable project to win a $10,000 grant from Wind.  The winner was MobileED, and received complimentary mobile broadband products and services from Wind in addition to the grant.  To commemorate its launches in the Niagara region and the city of London, Wind similarly plans to award one $10,000 grant per region.  The winner in the Niagara region was announced in January 2012.

See also
Wind Telecomunicazioni S.p.A., the third largest mobile operator in Italy.
Wind Hellas (formerly TIM Hellas), the third largest mobile operator in Greece.

References

External links

Canadian companies established in 2009
Telecommunications companies established in 2009
Companies based in Toronto
Mobile phone companies of Canada
Canadian brands
Shaw Communications
2009 establishments in Ontario
2016 mergers and acquisitions
Announced mergers and acquisitions